Plioviverrops is an extinct genus of terrestrial carnivore of the family Hyaenidae, endemic to Southern Europe during the Late Miocene subepoch (11.6—5.3 mya) existing for approximately . It was named by Kretzoi in 1938, and assigned to Hyaenidae by Flynn in 1998.

Resources

Prehistoric hyenas
Miocene carnivorans
Messinian extinctions
Cenozoic mammals of Europe
Cenozoic mammals of Africa
Prehistoric carnivoran genera
Tortonian extinctions